Aleksandr Borisovich Rodionov (12 September 1902 – 24 July 1944) was a Red Army colonel who held division command during World War II.

Early life and Russian Civil War 
Rodionov was born on 12 September 1902 in the city of Troitskosavsk, Transbaikal Oblast. He was conscripted into the Red Army in September 1921 and sent to serve in the guard company of the border troops headquarters in Chita, but was discharged from service for family reasons in November of that year. Rodionov was reconscripted into the army in March 1922 and appointed to the Verkhneudinsk Guard Battalion. From May he was listed with the 2nd Rifle Regiment of the 1st Chita Brigade, and from July in the uyezd military directorate at Iman. In September he was transferred to the 6th Khabarovsk Rifle Regiment of the 2nd Priamur Rifle Division, where he served as a company clerk and librarian. With the regiment, he fought in battles against the forces of Mikhail Diterikhs in the Primorsky operation and the Spassk operation during the final months of the Russian Civil War.

Interwar period 
From December 1923, Rodionov served as assistant politruk and then politruk of the 2nd company of the 6th Khabarovsk Rifle Regiment. In November 1924 he transferred to the 5th Amur Rifle Regiment of the division, where he served as assistant commander of the long-service platoon and company politruk, as responsible organizer of the Komsomol bureau and assistant political lecturer of the regimental school, and as assistant company commander for political section. In September 1927 he was sent to the Refresher course for commanders of the Siberian Military District at Irkutsk, and upon graduation in June 1928 was appointed to the 107th Vladimir Rifle Regiment of the 36th Rifle Division, where he served as commander of a platoon, rifle company, and supply company, battalion chief of staff, and assistant chief of staff of the regiment. During the Sino-Soviet conflict of 1929 guarded the Soviet border.

From April 1933 Rodionov studied at the Eastern Department of the Frunze Military Academy, and upon graduation in November 1936 was sent to serve as a senior tactics instructor at the Officers Improvement Course of the Intelligence Directorate of the Red Army. From September 1939 he was appointed assistant chief of the course and chief of the training department of the Advanced Officers Course of the 5th Directorate of the Red Army. In July 1940 then-Major Rodionov was transferred to serve as chief of the 1st (operational) staff department of the 112th Rifle Division of the Ural Military District, and on 10 June 1941 was appointed chief of staff of the division.

World War II 
When Operation Barbarossa began, the 112th Rifle Division was in the Reserve of the High Command. From 26 June it fought in heavy fighting in the area of Krāslava as part of the 51st Rifle Corps of the 22nd Army, then retreated towards Nevel. On 14 July the corps was 40 km from Nevel, and the city itself had already been captured by advancing German troops. On the night of 22 July the division attempted to break through. Rodionov and a column from the division headquarters broke off to the south and took the route of Yezerishche south of Nevel and north of Usvyaty and Kresty. Upon leaving the Usvyaty area Rodionov organized six partisan detachments from Red Army soldiers. On 26 August he gave the order for the detachments to exit the encirclement, and by 3 September they reached Soviet lines in the Mezha sector in the area of the village of Zikeyevo.

After departing the encirclement, Rodionov was in the reserve of the 22nd Army, and in early December was appointed chief of the combat training department of the 22nd Army. As part of the Kalinin Front, the army fought in the Kalinin Defensive operation, then in the offensive towards Rzhev. From February 1942 he was chief of the operational department of the headquarters of the 2nd Guards Rifle Corps. From March to April he was hospitalized due to a serious illness. After recovering Rodionov was appointed senior assistant chief of the operations department of the staff of the Kalinin Front. In June he was transferred to serve as chief of the operations section of the operations department of the staff of the 39th Army. In early July German troops attacked on the flank of the army and encircled it in the area of Bely.

For two weeks the 39th Army fought in encirclement, and after breaking through to Soviet lines on 17 September then-Lieutenant Colonel Rodionov took command of the 130th Separate Rifle Brigade. The brigade defended positions north of Rzhev, and from November joined the 30th Army of the Western Front. On 31 December Rodionov transferred to serve as the chief of staff of the 215th Rifle Division. Rodionov was promoted to colonel on 19 January 1943. During early 1943 the division defended positions northeast of Rzhev, and in March participated in the Rzhev-Vyazma Offensive. In early March Rodionov was sent to the front reserve. In July he was appointed chief of the operations department of the staff of the 39th Army of the Kalinin Front.

Rodionov served as acting commander of the 32nd Rifle Division from 25 August. He led it in the Dukhovshchina-Demidov offensive as part of the 39th Army, during which it captured Dukhovshchina and Rudnya. He was relieved of command on 19 October due to the poor state of his health and was sent to the rear for treatment. After recovering, Rodionov was appointed commander of the 91st Guards Rifle Division of the 5th Guards Rifle Corps of the 39th Army on 20 December. He was evaluated in combat characteristics as "tactically competent and correctly able to manage battle, which he demonstrated during the breakthrough of German defensive lines in the area of Goloburdy and Bondari on 3 February 1944." In early May he was relieved of command and sent to the front reserve. On 5 May he returned to duty as deputy commander of the 220th Rifle Division, then in the reserve of the 31st Army. In early June the division and its army were relocated to the 3rd Belorussian Front in the area east of Goroshkovo on the left bank of the Dnieper, where they trained for the upcoming offensive.

The 220th fought in the Vitebsk–Orsha offensive from 23 June, and on 27 June advanced into the eastern part of Orsha and captured the sole surviving railway bridge before it could be blown up, conducted an assault crossing of the Dnieper, and ensued the crossing of the remainder of the army. Continuing the offensive, the division reached the eastern bank of the Berezina in the Novoselki area, assault-crossing the river and on 2 July reached the Moscow-Minsk canal in the area of Zhodino. In the morning of 3 July the vanguard of the division mounted on motor vehicles in cooperation with the 2nd Tank and Cavalry Corps entered Minsk. After the capture of the city, the division continued the pursuit towards Rakuv. The division entered Ivenets on 8 July, Ivye on 10 July, and was in battle for Lida on 11 July. On 14 July the vanguard of the division under the command of Rodionov assault-crossed the Neman in thee Zaritsa area and Berzhany, 6-7 km north of Grodno and for two days repulsed German attacks. During the fighting Rodionov was mortally wounded and died of his wounds on 24 July. He was awarded the Order of the Red Banner.

References

Citations

Bibliography 

 

1902 births
1944 deaths
People from Transbaikal Oblast
Soviet military personnel killed in World War II
Soviet colonels
Recipients of the Order of the Red Banner